Jeffrey T. Mezger is an American businessman. He serves as the president and chief executive officer of KB Home.

Early life
Mezger was born in Chicago, Illinois. He graduated from DePauw University with a bachelor of science in economics in 1977.

Career
Mezger joined KB Home in 1993. From 1999 to 2006, he served as chief operating officer and executive vice president of KB Home. He has served as president and CEO since 2006.

Mezger sits on the board of directors of Builder Homesite and on the High Production Builders Council of the National Association of Home Builders. He also serves on the executive board of the Lusk Center for Real Estate at the University of Southern California and on the policy advisory board of the Fisher Center for Real Estate & Urban Economics at the University of California, Berkeley.

In 2010, Builder Magazine honored Mezger with its "CEO of the Year" award.

In 2017, Mezger was disciplined by KB Home after audio surfaced of him shouting profanities at his neighbor Kathy Griffin.

References

Living people
American chief executives
American real estate businesspeople
DePauw University alumni
Businesspeople from Chicago
University of California, Berkeley people
University of Southern California people
Year of birth missing (living people)